Jawhar William dela Cruz Purdy (born December 15, 1991) is a Filipino-American professional basketball player for the Kuala Lumpur Dragons of the ASEAN Basketball League. He played college basketball at the California State University, Stanislaus (2013-2014) and College of the Canyons (2011-2013) and was drafted with the 1st pick of the fifth round in the 2015 PBA draft by the Blackwater Elite. He joined the Westports Malaysia Dragons in 2017 and was part of the team for the rest of 2017–18 ABL season. He also played for the AMA Titans in the PBA D-League.

Personal life
Purdy was born in 1991 in Los Angeles to Fatima dela Cruz of Davao City, and William Purdy, a Jackson, Mississippi native. He completed his higher education at Saugus High School and completed his graduation in 2010.

Career statistics

References

1991 births
Living people
Filipino men's basketball players
Kuala Lumpur Dragons players
Shooting guards
American men's basketball players
Basketball players from Los Angeles
American sportspeople of Filipino descent
Citizens of the Philippines through descent